Spanish brothers Marcel and Gerard Granollers-Pujol won this tournament, by defeating Evgeny Kirillov and Andrey Kuznetsov 6–3, 6–2 in the final.

Seeds

Draw

Finals

References
 Doubles Draw
 Qualifying Doubles Draw

Yugra Cup - Doubles
Yugra Cup
2009 in Russian tennis